The 2015–16 Kent State Golden Flashes women's basketball team represented Kent State University during the 2015–16 NCAA Division I women's basketball season. The Golden Flashes, led by fourth year head coach Danielle O'Banion, played their home games at the Memorial Athletic and Convocation Center, also known as the MAC Center, as members of the East Division of the Mid-American Conference. They finished the season 6–23, 3–15 in MAC play to finish in a tie for fifth place in the East Division. They were seeded 12th in the 2016 MAC women's basketball tournament and lost in the first round to Eastern Michigan.

On March 15, Kent State and Head Coach Danielle O'Banion mutually agreed to part ways. She finished at Kent State with a 4 year record of 21–98.

Roster

Schedule and results
Source: 

|-
!colspan=9 style="background:#F7BD0A; color:#131149;"| Exhibition

|-
!colspan=9 style="background:#F7BD0A; color:#131149;"| Non-Conference Games

|-
!colspan=9 style="background:#F7BD0A; color:#131149;"| Conference Games

|-
!colspan=9 style="background:#F7BD0A; color:#131149;"| MAC Women's Tournament

See also
 2015–16 Kent State Golden Flashes men's basketball team

References

2015–16 Kent State Record Book

Kent State
Kent State Golden Flashes women's basketball seasons
Kent State
Kent State